Provincial council elections were held in Sri Lanka on 21 September 2013 to elect 148 members to three of the nine provincial councils in the country. 4.4 million Sri Lankans were eligible to vote in the election. Elections to the remaining six provincial councils were not due as they had their last election in 2009 or 2012. This was the first provincial council election in the Northern Province in 25 years.

The United People's Freedom Alliance's domination of Sri Lankan elections continued as expected. It retained control of two provincial councils (Central and North Western) but the Tamil National Alliance won control of the first Northern Provincial Council.

Background
In an attempt to end the Sri Lankan Civil War the Indo-Lanka Accord was signed on 29 July 1987. One of the requirements of the accord was that the Sri Lankan government to devolve powers to the provinces. Accordingly on 14 November 1987 the Sri Lankan Parliament passed the 13th Amendment to the 1978 Constitution of Sri Lanka and the Provincial Councils Act No 42 of 1987. On 3 February 1988 nine provincial councils were created by order. The first elections for provincial councils took place on 28 April 1988 in North Central, North Western, Sabaragamuwa, and Uva provinces. On 2 June 1988 elections were held for provincial councils for Central, Southern and Western provinces. The United National Party (UNP), which was in power nationally, won control of all seven provincial councils.

The Indo-Lanka Accord also required the merger of the Eastern and Northern provinces into one administrative unit. The accord required a referendum to be held by 31 December 1988 in the Eastern Province to decide whether the merger should be permanent. Crucially, the accord allowed the Sri Lankan president to postpone the referendum at his discretion. On September 2 and 8 1988 President Jayewardene issued proclamations enabling the Eastern and Northern provinces to be one administrative unit administered by one elected council, creating the North Eastern Province. Elections in the newly merged North Eastern Province were held on 19 November 1988. The Eelam People's Revolutionary Liberation Front, an Indian backed paramilitary group, won control of the North Eastern provincial council.

On 1 March 1990, just as the Indian Peace Keeping Force were preparing to withdraw from Sri Lanka, Annamalai Varadaraja Perumal, Chief Minister of the North Eastern Province, moved a motion in the North Eastern Provincial Council declaring an independent Eelam. President Premadasa reacted to Permual's UDI by dissolving the provincial council and imposing direct rule on the province.

The 2nd Sri Lankan provincial council election was held in 1993 in seven provinces. The UNP retained control of six provincial councils but lost control of the largest provincial council, Western, to the opposition People's Alliance. A special election was held in Southern Province in 1994 after some UNP provincial councillors defected to the opposition. The PA won the election and took control of the Southern Provincial Council.

The 3rd Sri Lankan provincial council election was held in 1999 in seven provinces. The PA, which was now in power nationally, managed to win the majority of seats in two provinces (North Central and North Western). It was also able to form a majority administration in the other five provinces with the support of smaller parties such as the Ceylon Workers' Congress (CWC) . The UNP regained control of the Central Provincial Council in 2002 after the CWC councillors crossed over to the opposition.

The 4th Sri Lankan provincial council election was held in 2004 in seven provinces. The United People's Freedom Alliance (UPFA), the successor to the PA, won all seven provinces.

On 14 July 2006, after a long campaign against the merger, the JVP filed three separate petitions with the Supreme Court of Sri Lanka requesting a separate Provincial Council for the East. On 16 October 2006 the Supreme Court ruled that the proclamations issued by President Jayewardene were null and void and had no legal effect. The North Eastern Province was formally demerged into the Northern and Eastern provinces on 1 January 2007.

The 5th Sri Lankan provincial council election was held on a staggered basis during 2008/09 in eight provinces including the newly demerged Eastern Province. The UPFA won all eight provinces.

Soon after the civil war ended in May 2009 there were calls for election to be held for the Northern Provincial Council. In January 2010 government minister Douglas Devananda stated that the election would be held soon after the 2010 presidential election. But the election wasn't held although presidential, parliamentary and local elections were held in the Northern Province. As the government procrastinated, international pressure mounted. In an interview with The Hindu in July 2012 President Rajapaksa stated the election would be held in September 2013. In March 2013 the United Nations Human Rights Council passed a resolution which, amongst other things, welcomed the decision to hold the election in September 2013.

The 6th Sri Lankan provincial council election was also held on a staggered basis. Elections were held on 8 September 2012 in Eastern, North Central and Sabaragamuwa provinces. The UPFA won the majority of seats in two provinces (North Central and Sabaragamuwa) and was also able to form a majority administration in Eastern Provinces with the support of the Sri Lanka Muslim Congress. On 5 July 2013 President Rajapaksa issued a proclamation ordering the Election Commissioner to conduct elections for the Northern Provincial Council. Central Provincial Council and North Western Provincial Council were also dissolved by their governors on 5 July 2013.

Details
Nominations took place between 25 July 2013 and 1 August 2013. 210 nominations (131 form registered political parties, 79 from independent groups) were received by the returning officers of which 201 nominations (126 form registered political parties, 75 from independent groups) were accepted and nine nominations (five form registered political parties, four from independent groups) were rejected. The UPFA, UNP and Janatha Vimukthi Peramuna are contesting in all ten districts, the Tamil National Alliance is contesting in the five districts in Northern Province whilst the Sri Lanka Muslim Congress, a constituent party of the UPFA, is contesting separately in seven districts.

After the nomination period had ended Election Commissioner Mahinda Deshapriya announced that the elections would be held on 21 September 2013.

Results

Overall
The UPFA won control of two provincial councils (Central and North Western) whilst the TNA won control of Northern Provincial Council.

Central Province
Results of the 6th Central Provincial Council election held on 21 September 2013:

Northern Province
Results of the 1st Northern Provincial Council election held on 21 September 2013:

North Western Province
Results of the 6th North Western Provincial Council election held on 21 September 2013:

References and footnotes

External links

2013 elections in Asia
Provincial council elections
2013
September 2013 events in Asia
Indian Peace Keeping Force